Mount Hunt Divide is a pedestrian mountain pass located in the Teton Range, Grand Teton National Park, in the U.S. state of Wyoming. Access to Mount Hunt Divide involves a  hike along the Open Canyon Trail, which is accessed from the Death Canyon trailhead.
The pass is just east of Mount Hunt and both were named after William Price Hunt.

References

Mountain passes of Wyoming
Mountain passes of Teton County, Wyoming